Yachvili is a Georgian surname of Iashvili written in French.

It is the surname of two rugby union players (father and son) who both played for France. 

Dimitri Yachvili (born 1980), mostly played for Biarritz 
Michel Yachvili, (born 1946), mostly played for Brive

See also
Iashvili